Blanka Bohdanová (4 March 1930 – 3 October 2021) was a Czech film, stage and television actress, who performed over 80 roles at the National Theatre in Prague over a period of more than 50 years. Her best known movie roles were in Romeo, Juliet and Darkness, Když rozvod, tak rozvod and Thirty Cases of Major Zeman. She received a lifetime achievement award at the Thalia Awards' 2015 ceremony.

References

External links
 
 

1930 births
2021 deaths
Czech film actresses
Actors from Plzeň
20th-century Czech actresses
21st-century Czech actresses
Czech stage actresses
Janáček Academy of Music and Performing Arts alumni
People from Plzeň
Recipients of the Thalia Award